Jiří Janeček (born December 29, 1973) is a Czech politician, founder and former leader of the Civic Conservative Party (OKS). He was also a former member of the Chamber of Deputies of the parliament of the Czech Republic in the capital Prague from 2008 to 2010. He is also the leader and founder of the Chcípl PES movement. Known for being against measures against the covid-19 pandemic.

He supports the Russian invasion of Ukraine, in which he, using the Chcípl PES Facebook page, criticized Czech Prime Minister Petr Fiala, calling him a "useful idiot" of the United States for helping Ukraine. He said that "Putin is not crazy, but if there is genocide in the breakaway republics, he will have no choice but to intervene. Sending bullets at construction sites is an act of war that knows no analogues."

Biography

Business Life 
Before politics, he was a businessman, he was once managing director and partner of the company J+J spol. s ro (1993-2003) and in the company EUROGURMAN (2001-2005). In 2009, he participated in the Rallye Dakar race, taking 41st place. He went into debt in 2019 on his daughters' apartments, then stopped. He also claimed that measures against the Covid-19 pandemic have destroyed his successful business. He currently owns the Malý Janek brewery.

Political life 
Before he was a member of the Young Social Democrats, then he went to the Civic Democratic Party(ODS) between, being president of ODS Prague 11 in 2004, claiming to never be afraid of “the cries of the left” and to present “non-populist solutions and proposals”. He was also vice president of the ODS in Prague in 2005. He was a councilor of the Prague City Council between 2006 and 2010, being elected in both municipal elections. He became a member of the Chamber of Deputies of the Czech Republic's parliament in 2008, after the resignation of Tomáš Kladívko, in which he was involved in the defense and security committees, and in the subcommittees of municipal police and intelligence. In 2010, he ran in the elections for the capital of Prague, coming in 5th place, in which he stated that "...If he fails in Prague, he will suffer a great defeat at the national level...".

In 2012, the Czech court ruled that it was illegal for Jiří Janeček to be collecting 2 million crowns (approximately $90,722.00) from businesswoman Eva Krejčí, at the time he was a councilor in Prague's city council. He had loaned in 2009 to Krejčí in cash, which is prohibited by the money laundering law, also having to ask deputy Miroslav Svoboda for a loan as he was saddled with a mortgage but had not made a declaration of ownership. At first, the municipal court rejected the payment, but later the higher court ordered Eva Krejčí to pay the debt. After being asked why he borrowed the money, he replied: "I have a son with a serious heart defect at home and my sister's son is blind. I donated my entire parliamentary salary to charity at the time, I did what I thought was right . As you can see, I will think more next time".

Withdrawal from ODS and founding of the Civic Conservative Party 
Before leaving the ODS, he had founded the right faction in February 2013, a faction in the ODS, even though he was criticized by ODS members. He also resigns as president of ODS Prague 11. In the same year, he leaves the ODS, stating that he had lost his right-wing ideals, taking left-wing values. In late 2013, he founded the Civic Conservative Party (OKS), based on the right faction, he became president of the party in February 2014.

In the OKS party, he ran in the 2014 Prague City Council elections, Prague Mayor and Prague City Council 11, in both of which he was not elected.

In October of the same year, the police charged him and 39 other former deputies were charged with abuse of power and selling municipal property between 2010 and 2011, in which he claims he feels he is innocent.

In December 2015, he ceases to be president of OKS, in which in March 2016, Barbora Štěpánková becomes president of the party.

Covid-19 pandemic 
In the covid-19 pandemic, he has shown himself to be against containment measures, in which he stated that “The government failed with its restrictions and started a much more lethal pandemic of poverty, unemployment, companies collapsing”. In 2020, he founded Chcípl PES, a movement against the restrictions of the pandemic, especially against the restrictions on the operation of restaurants. In 2021, he organized a protest against the measures, in which protesters built a chain of beer glasses and also held Czech flags, some protesters were anti-vaccine. He stated about the protests that "The chaotic measures taken by this government do not work and will never work".

References

External links 
 http://www.jirijanecek.cz

Members of the Chamber of Deputies of the Czech Republic (2006–2010)
Civic Democratic Party (Czech Republic) politicians
1973 births
Living people